Mike Rosenthal (born June 10, 1977) is a former American football offensive tackle. He played college football at Notre Dame, where he was an All-American. He was drafted by the New York Giants in the fifth round of the 1999 NFL Draft, and played nine seasons in the National Football League (NFL).

Early years
Rosenthal was born in Pittsburgh, Pennsylvania, and is Jewish.

In high school at Penn High School, he was named USA Today All-America as a senior in Mishawaka, Indiana.  He also garnered All-America honors from Parade, SuperPrep, and Blue Chip Illustrated, earning top OL honors nationally by SuperPrep and ranking # 2 by Blue Chip.  He was tabbed as Indiana's Gatorade Circle of Champions Player of the Year as a senior. He lettered three times in football, and twice in basketball.

College career
At Notre Dame he started every game his junior and senior years (*Actually he started all four years), playing G as a junior and T as a senior.  As a senior, he was tabbed an All-America by Walter Camp Foundation and a second-team All-America by Football News.  He was also honorable mention All-America by Football News as a junior, and All-Independent 1st-team choice.

He later attended St. Edward's University, graduating in 2013.

Awards and honors
 First-team All-Independent (1997)
 Honorable mention Football News All-American (1997)
 First-team Walter Camp Foundation All-American (1998)
 Second-team Football News All-American (1998)

Professional career
He was drafted out of Notre Dame in the fifth round of the 1999 NFL Draft by the New York Giants, and played nine seasons in the NFL.  In 1999, he played in 9 games with 7 starts as rookie with Giants.  In 2000, he played in 8 games and started 2 for the Giants, and in 2001 he played in 7 games.  In 2002, he started all 16 games and the Wildcard Playoff game at RT for the Giants.

In March 2003 he became an unrestricted free agent, and signed with the Minnesota Vikings for $1.8 million.  2003 was his first season with the Vikings, and he started all 16 games at RT for the 2nd consecutive season.  He helped pave the way for the Vikings' offense to rank #1 in the NFL for the first time in team history.  In 2004, he suffered a broken right foot in the second game of the season.  He was placed on injured reserve on September 22.  In 2005, he played in all 16 games, making 12 starts at right tackle.  He lost his starting job to Marcus Johnson in late November, but came back to start the final two games of the season.

Hall of Fame
Rosenthal was inducted into the Jewish Sports Hall of Fame in 2002. He was inducted into the Indiana Football Hall of Fame in 2014.

Beyond the game
Rosenthal and his wife, Lindsay, own and operate “1379 Sports” (1379Sports.com), a clothing store in Austin, Texas. In 2010, Mike began teaching and coaching football at Stephen F. Austin High School in Austin, Texas and became head football coach there in December 2011. He became the head athletic director in 2012.

In 2022, Rosenthal became the Athletic Director of Mira Costa High School in Manhattan Beach, California.

See also
List of select Jewish football players

References

1977 births
Living people
American football offensive tackles
New York Giants players
Minnesota Vikings players
Miami Dolphins players
Notre Dame Fighting Irish football players
Jewish American sportspeople
People from Mishawaka, Indiana
People from Austin, Texas
Players of American football from Pittsburgh
21st-century American Jews